David Schlaepfer is a California-born scientist known for his studies on cell migration and cancer metastasis.  His early research focused on signaling by protein kinases, with a subsequent focus on the proteins that regulate the turnover of cell contacts with the extracellular matrix. In particular, Schlaepfer is well known for his studies on focal adhesion kinase (FAK).

Education and works 
Schlaepfer received his PhD in Biological Sciences after training in the laboratory of Harry Haigler at the University of California, Irvine in 1992, with early work focused on the function and regulation of protein kinase C (PKC). Schlaepfer then moved to the Salk Institute to train with Tony Hunter, a pioneer in the study of protein-tyrosine phosphorylation, where his work focused on FAK. In 1995, Schlaepfer won the Santa Cruz Biotechnology investigator award.  By 1996, Schlaepfer was awarded a position as an assistant professor at The Scripps Research Institute in La Jolla, where he advanced to the associate professor level. In 2007, Schlaepfer joined the Department of Reproductive Medicine in the School of Medicine at the University of California, San Diego as a full professor.

As of 2021, Schlaepfer is a Professor in the Department of Obstetrics, Gynecology and Reproductive Science in the School of Medicine at the University of California, San Diego.

Key publications

External links
 
 The David D. Schlaepfer Laboratory at UCSD
 The Schlaepfer Laboratory
 Profile Schlaepfer

Living people
University of California, San Diego faculty
Cell biologists
Year of birth missing (living people)